Vaghua (Vagua), or Tavula, is an indigenous language of Choiseul Province, Solomon Islands.

References

Languages of the Solomon Islands
Northwest Solomonic languages